Westergaardodinidae is an extinct family of conodonts in the order Paraconodontida.

It consists of the genus Westergaardodina.

References

External links 

 

Paraconodontida
Conodont families